Weifang Medical University (WMU) is a medical university based in Weifang, Shandong, province, in China.

History
The university was created as Shandong province's Changwei Medical School in 1951. The university was then created as the Changwei Medical College which offered undergraduate courses.

In 1986, the university was approved by the Chinese Ministry of Education to offer master's degree courses in medicine. 

In 1987, the university was restructured and became Weifang Medical University.

In 2002, the Chinese Ministry of Education granted the Weifang Medical University permission to offer graduate medical degrees.

Academics

After doing MBBS in WHO-recognized universities, overseas students can make their way to other countries of the world or can go back to their own countries for house jobs and practice as a doctor.

Weifang Medical University (WFMU) is a state-owned medical university. It is located in Weifang, the international Kite Capital, at the centre of the Shandong Peninsula. WFMU covers an area of more than 1.2 million square meters with 570,000 square meters of the construction area. Over the past decades, a comprehensive and multi-disciplinary pattern has been formed at WFMU which offered a number of disciplines including medical sciences, health management, general sciences, law and literature, with the medical sciences as the leading discipline. WFMU is authorized to grant bachelor's and master's degrees and recruit overseas students.

WFMU is authorized to recruit PhD candidates in collaboration with Shandong University, Southern Medical University and Huazhong University of Science and Technology, Shandong Medical Technology Educational Centre and the Basic-level Health Management Cadres Training Centre.

Schools and departments
WFMU comprises 15 schools and departments, such as the School of Humanities and Social Science, School of Public Health and Management, Nursing School, Dentistry School, Clinical Medicine Department, Anesthesiology Department, Medical Radiology Department and Preventive Medicine Department.

Teaching staff
At present, there are 1000 teaching staff. There are four supervisors for doctoral students and nearly 200 for master's students.

Postgraduate programs
There are 24 postgraduate programs, mainly enrolling postgraduates in Physiology, Immunology, Pharmacology, Anatomy, Embryology, Pathology and Pathophysiology, Pathogen Biology, Biochemistry and Molecule Biology, Internal Medicine, Surgery, Gynecology, Pediatrics, Ophthalmology, Otolaryngology, Dentistry, Neurology, Oncology, Traditional and Western Clinic Medicine, Emergency, Imaging and Nuclear Medicine, Nursing, Anesthesiology, Epidemiology and Health Statistics, Social Medicine and Health Cause Management and Applied Psychology. There are over 740 postgraduate students.

Undergraduate programs
Specialities
 MBBS&BDS   
 TCM   
 Chinese language program

The university offers 16 undergraduate programs: Clinical medicine, Dentistry, Nursing, Anesthesiology, Medical Imaging, Medical Laboratory, Preventive Medicine, Pharmacy, Public Health and Management, Labor and Social Security, Marketing, Law, Applied Psychology, Health Statistics, Biological Technology, English Language. There are over 14,000 full-time 3- and 5-year  program students.

Research centers
WFMU has always focused on teaching and constantly improved quality. There is a Medical Research Center, a Modern Educational Technology Center, a Computer Center and an Animal Supplying Center. More than 10,000 sets of scientific and research instruments such as confocal laser scanning microscope(Zeiss), flow cytometer (Beckman Coulter) and image processors, are worth over RMB 110 million.

There is one experimental demonstration centre at the provincial level. There are six comprehensive teaching laboratories at the university level — Morphology, Function, Chemicoanalysis, Clinical Skills, Computer and Human Anatomy — and 16 speciality laboratories like Gene and Histology Engineering, Dentistry, and Nursing which are equipped with advanced Imaging PACS System, Digital Network Interactive Laboratory Teaching System, BL-410 Biological Function Experiment System, and so on.

The Experimental Center of Basic Medicine is an experimental and teaching demonstration centre for universities in Shandong Province. Anatomy, Medical Ethics, Pathology, Physiology, Histology and Embryology, Pharmacology and Medical Imaging are assessed as excellent subjects at the provincial level. WFMU has undertaken 90 teaching and research projects at the provincial level or above and has been awarded 24 prizes in teaching, experiment and research since 2004.

WFMU has one discipline which offers posts for “Taishan Scholars”, seven key provincial academic disciplines and laboratories,  including Anatomy and Histological Embryology, Surgery, Medical Radiology, Ophthalmology, Immunology, Applied Pharmacology, and Dental medicine. There are 24 research institutes such as Pathology, Neurophysiology, Differentiation and Cycle of Stem Cell,  Molecule Cell Biology, Urology Surgery, Orthopedics, Pediatrics, Anesthesiology, Community Medicine, Health Management, Epidemiology, Health Statistics and Health Economy.

Achievements in research
In recent years, WFMU has made many achievements in research. More than 340 research projects have been approved by the state authorities, including 16 large projects sponsored by the Foundation of State Natural Science and the national key laboratory projects, 40 projects granted by the Provincial Natural Science Fund and Middle-aged and Youth Scientists Fund and 260 projects at the bureau level. More than 220 prizes for research have been awarded, including 50 prizes for specialists at the provincial level.

More than 870 academic papers and 70 books are published each year. Over 30 achievements have been popularized for continuing education at the provincial level or above. WFMU has got over 10 national patents and good social economic and social beneficial effects have been achieved.

The university library holds a collection of over 2.1 million books and 3,000 kinds of Chinese and foreign journals. There are 12 comprehensive affiliated hospitals.

International exchange
The university has established extensive inter-relationships with many overseas universities such as Western State College in California, U.S.A., Ukraine Haerkefu State Academy, Ukraine Haerkefu State Medical Academy, Ukraine Dnipropetrovsk State Medical Academy; RMIT and La Trobe University of Australia, College of Saskatchewan of Canada, and University of Occupational and Environmental Health of Japan. More than 160 foreign experts have been invited to visit or teach at WFMU, over 170 teachers have studied abroad, and many staff have been sent abroad as medical succor. More than 60 famous professors all over the world have been invited to be guest professors at the university. WFMU recruits overseas students every year, and there are nearly 600 overseas students from  Zambia, Ghana, India, Nepal, South Africa, Zimbabwe and Pakistan at present.

It is one of the universities which are authorized to hold HSK.

References

External links
 Weifang Medical University

Students Forum Link
 Weifang Medical University Foreign Students Online Forum

 Universities and colleges in Shandong
 Medical schools in China
 Universities in China with English-medium medical schools